Apple Tree Creek is a rural town and locality in the Bundaberg Region, Queensland, Australia. It was formerly known as Bodalla, the Dundaburra people of the Northern Kabi group name from the Gregory River Plum which to first Europeans looked like an apple. Prior to settlement of the Isis District which includes Apple tree Creek - the area was called Buth'arth  translating to scrub. The town was renamed in 1962.

Geography 
Apple Tree Creek is located 6 km north-west of Childers on the Isis Highway.

History
The area was called Buth'arth meaning scrub in Dundaburra language.

European settlers entered the district  from the 1840s. The initial industries were grazing, sawmilling and then growing sugarcane.

Apple Tree Creek Provisional School opened on 28 November 1887. It became Apple Tree Creek State School on 5 July 1897. It closed on 21 December 1969.

In 1896 a railway line extending from Childers to Cordalba was erected, bypassing Apple Tree Creek.

The Apple Tree Creek cemetery was established in 1896.

The Apple Tree Creek Post Office opened around January 1909 (a receiving office had been open since 1898) and closed in 1975.

St Anne's Anglican Church was dedicated on 10 July 1930 by Venerable William Powning Glover, Archdeacon of Toowoomba. It has since closed.

Heritage listings
Apple Tree Creek has a number of heritage-listed sites, including:
 Bruce Highway: Apple Tree Creek War Memorial
Drummond Street (near the junction with Gentle Annie Road): Apple Tree Creek Cemetery

References

External links

 
 Town map of Apple Tree Creek, 1974

Towns in Queensland
Wide Bay–Burnett
Bundaberg Region
Localities in Queensland